European route E 578 is a European B class road in Romania, connecting the cities Sărăţel and Chichiș.

Route and E-road junctions 
  (on shared signage  DN15A then  DN15 then  DN12)
 Sărăţel:  
 Chichiș:

External links 
 UN Economic Commission for Europe: Overall Map of E-road Network (2007)
 International E-road network

Roads in Romania